Michael J. Connor, is a retired United States Navy Vice Admiral. Connor held several, concurrent titles during his last assignment including Commander, United States Submarine Forces (COMNAVSUBFOR), Commander, Submarine Forces Atlantic (COMSUBLANT) and Commander, Allied Submarine Command. Connor served as commander of the U.S. submarine forces from September 2012 until September 2015.

Early life and education
Connor grew up in Weymouth, Mass., and graduated in 1980 from Bowdoin College.

Military career
Connor, like all U.S. submarine officers (with the exception of supply officers and some Limited Duty Officers (LDO) and Chief Warrant Officers assigned to Ballistic Missile Submarines) attended Nuclear Power School and received submarine training. Between serving on Augusta and commanding Seawolf, Connor worked as Flag Secretary on the staff of the Commander Submarine Force, U.S. Atlantic Fleet.

After his tour on Seawolf, Connor attended Naval War College where he earned a Master of Arts in National Security Affairs and Strategic Studies. Connor also commanded Submarine Squadron Eight from March 2003 through July 2004, and Submarine Group Seven from June 2008 until April 2010.

Admiral Connor was relieved in a change of command ceremony by Vice Admiral Joseph E. Tofalo on September 11, 2015 and retired from the Navy at that time.

See also
United States Fleet Forces Command
Submarines in the United States Navy
Virginia-class submarine
List of submarine classes of the United States Navy

References

External links
Submarine Warfare Division website Information, history, and US Navy articles
Undersea Warfare magazine Undersea Warfare is the official magazine of the US Navy undersea warfare community.
Official US Navy submarine websites 
Official COMSUBLANT website

United States Navy vice admirals
Naval War College alumni
Recipients of the Navy Distinguished Service Medal
Recipients of the Defense Superior Service Medal
Recipients of the Legion of Merit
People from Weymouth, Massachusetts
Living people
1961 births
Military personnel from Massachusetts